Hashtrud County is in East Azerbaijan province, Iran. The capital of the county is Hashtrud (Sarāskand). At the 2006 census, the county's population was 64,611 in 13,997 households. The following census in 2011 counted 60,822 people in 16,245 households. At the 2016 census, the county's population was 57,199 in 17,173 households.

Administrative divisions

The population history of Hashtrud County's administrative divisions over three consecutive censuses is shown in the following table. The latest census shows two districts, seven rural districts, and two cities.

References

 

Counties of East Azerbaijan Province